is a Japanese footballer who plays as a defender for  club Ventforet Kofu.

Career statistics

Club
.

References

2000 births
Living people
Association football people from Tokyo
Nippon Sport Science University alumni
Japanese footballers
Association football midfielders
J2 League players
FC Tokyo players
Ventforet Kofu players